Vanderheyden is a surname. Notable people with the surname include:
 Barbara Vanderhyden, Canadian researcher of ovarian cancer
 Jan van der Heyden (1637–1712), Dutch Baroque-era painter, glass painter, draughtsman and printmaker
 Jan Vanderheyden (1890–1961), Belgian film producer and director
 JCJ Vanderheyden (1928–2012), Dutch painter and photographer
 Kris Vanderheyden or Insider, Belgian techno and electronic music pioneer
 Sandra Vander-Heyden (born 1964), American Olympic field hockey player

See also
 Van der Heijden, a Dutch toponymic surname
 William H. VanderHeyden House, a historic house in Ionia, Michigan
 Vanderheyden, a non-profit organization based in Wynantskill, New York